Wachirabarami is an amphoe in the northwestern part of Phichit province, central Thailand.

Geography
Neighboring districts are (from the north clockwise) Bang Rakam of Phitsanulok province, Sam Ngam of Phichit Province, Sai Ngam and Lan Krabue of Kamphaeng Phet province.

History
The district was established on 21 October 1998 by splitting off four tambons from Sam Ngam district.

Administration
The district is divided into four sub-districts (tambons), which are further subdivided into 50 villages (mubans). There are no municipal (thesaban) areas, and four tambon administrative organizations (TAO).

References

External links
amphoe.com

Wachirabarami